Virginia Hesse (born 1944) is a Ghanaian civil servant and diplomat who served as Ghana's ambassador to the Czech Republic from 2017 to 2021. She spent a majority of her professional career in the Ghanaian public service.

Family life and education

A native of Osu, Accra, Virginia Hesse is a member of the notable Hesse family. Her brother, Lebrecht Wilhelm Fifi Hesse (1934 – 2000) was the first black African Rhodes Scholar, two-time Director-General of the Ghana Broadcasting Corporation and a member of the Public Services Commission of Ghana.  Her other brother, Christian Hesse served as Ghana's ambassador to the Soviet Union and later to Russia in the 1980s and 1990s. She is an alumna of the University of Ghana, Legon.

Career 
She worked at the Ministry of Trade and Industry in Accra, as a commercial officer and at the ministry's diplomacy department.  She was Ghana's Deputy Trade Commissioner at the Court of St James's. In the private sector, she also worked for a Swiss international firm as a project manager and later, for water supply and sewage treatment plants. She was also the President of the Accra chapter of the women's empowerment global non-profit, Zonta International.

Diplomatic career
She was sworn into office as the Ghanaian Ambassador to the Czech Republic, together with four other envoys, on 2 August 2017 by Nana Akufo-Addo, the president of Ghana. She was also among 20 Ghanaian women ambassadors selected that year. As ambassador, she had concurrent accreditation to North Macedonia, Romania and other Visegrád Group nations, Hungary and Slovakia. She was also the Dean of the African Group of the Czech Republic. She finished her four-year term in 2021.

Personal life 
Virginia Hesse has one daughter, Gyankroma Akufo-Addo whose father is Nana Akufo-Addo. Hesse is a lifelong Presbyterian and a member of the Ebenezer Presbyterian Church, Osu.

References

Living people
Date of birth missing (living people)
Place of birth missing (living people)
Ga-Adangbe people
Ghanaian civil servants
Ghanaian people of Danish descent
Ghanaian people of German descent
Ghanaian Presbyterians
Ghanaian Protestants
Hesse family of Ghana
People from Accra
University of Ghana alumni
Ghanaian women ambassadors
Ambassadors of Ghana to Czech Republic
1944 births